Jakub Fiala (born 24 May 1975 in Prague) is a former alpine skier who competed in the 1999 Alpine Skiing World Championships in Vail and in 2002 Winter Olympics with an American license.

External links
 sports-reference.com

1975 births
Living people
American male alpine skiers
Olympic alpine skiers of the United States
Alpine skiers at the 2002 Winter Olympics
Czechoslovak emigrants to the United States
Sportspeople from Prague